The Echinocereeae are a tribe of cacti in the subfamily Cactoideae. Since 2006, the tribe has included the former tribe Pachycereeae in many treatments of cactus classification. The exact circumscription of the tribe has been subject to considerable change, particularly since molecular phylogenetic approaches have been used in determining classifications, and remains uncertain. The tribe includes large treelike species, such as the saguaro (Carnegiea gigantea), as well as shorter shrubby species. Most members of the tribe are found in desert regions, particularly in Mexico and the southwestern United States.

Description
The tribe includes large treelike species, as well as shorter shrubby species. Their stems are ribbed and columnar, not divided into segments. Most have flowers that open at night.

Taxonomy
In 1958, Franz Buxbaum published a division into tribes of what is now the subfamily Cactoideae, then Cereoideae. Two of these tribes were Pachycereeae (which he spelt "Pachycereae") and Echinocereeae (which he spelt "Echinocereae"). Pachycereeae was a newly published taxon; Echinocereeae was an elevation of the subtribe Echinocereinae ("Echinocereanae") established by Britton and Rose in 1922. Studies based on chloroplast DNA showed that Echinocereus, the type genus of the Echinocereeae, was nested within the Pachycereeae, as then circumscribed, and Pachycereeae was expanded to include Echinocereeae. In 2006, David Hunt and the International Cactaceae Systematics Group used the name Echinocereeae rather than Pachycereeae for the tribe. This has been followed in much subsequent work, including a major 2011 molecular phylogenetic analysis of the family Cactaceae. However, some authors continue to use the name Pachycereeae for the tribe.

Phylogeny
Genera placed at one time or another within the Echinocereeae (or Pachycereeae) fell within the "Core Cactoideae I" clade in the 2011 molecular phylogenetic study by  Barcenas et al. Possible phylogenetic relationships within this clade are shown in the cladogram below, based on Guerrero et al. (2019) and revisions to the Hylocereeae in 2017 and 2020.

Genera
"Core Echinocereeae" recovered in molecular phylogenetic analyses in 2005 and 2011 contains the following genera, often only in part compared to earlier generic circumscriptions. Some genera were further placed in two subtribes, Pachycereinae and Echinocereinae.

The 2011 study found the tribe Hylocereeae to be embedded within a wider Echinocereeae, but studies in 2017 and 2020 asserted the independence of the Hylocereeae, including within it two genera placed within Pachycereeae in earlier classifications: Acanthocereus and Pseudoacanthocereus (sunk into Strophocactus).

Distribution and habitat
Members of the Echinocereeae are native from the southwestern United States, through Mexico, Central America and the Caribbean to northern South America. Many are classic columnar desert cacti of Mexico and the southwestern US, like the saguaro (Carnegiea gigantea). A few have a wider distribution: Stenocereus griseus is found from northeastern Mexico to Colombia.

References

 
Caryophyllales tribes